The Kh-90 GELA (Hypersonic Experimental Flight Vehicle) is a Soviet/Russian air-to-surface cruise missile. It was supposed to replace subsonic intermediate range missiles in the Soviet inventory. The missile was an ambitious project, as the main objective was to develop it into a hypersonic missile. It was to be a successor to the Kh-45, which never entered service.

The missile was designed by Raduga. It was equipped with a one-megaton thermonuclear warhead and used inertial navigation with mid-course update via data link. It had a maximum range of 3,000 km.

It was developed at the beginning of 1980, following the Kh-80 and Kholod projects. It was shown to the public an MAKS Airshow 1995.

See also

Ra'ad
SOM
Ya-Ali
Shahab-3
Fajr-3
Shaheen-III
Ashoura (missile)
Sejjil
Ghauri-I
Ababeel

References

External links

DB A5-90 (Russian Language)

Nuclear cruise missiles of Russia
Air-to-surface missiles of Russia
MKB Raduga products